The chief minister of Bagmati Province is the chief executive of the Nepal state of Bagmati Province. The position was created in 2018. , Bagmati has had three chief ministers.

Description 

In accordance with the Constitution of Nepal, the governor is a state's de jure head, but de facto executive authority rests with the chief minister. The chief minister of Bagmati Province is the chief executive of Bagmati Province. Following elections to the Povincial Assembly of Bagmati Province, the state's governor usually invites the party (or coalition) with a majority of seats to form the government. The governor appoints the chief minister, whose council of ministers are collectively responsible to the assembly. Given the confidence of the assembly, the chief minister's term is for five years and is not subject to term limits.

Chief ministers 
From 2018 when the chief minister position was created, three people have been Chief Minister of Bagmati Province.
 Astalaxmi Shakya of the CPN (Unified Marxist-Lininist) was the first chief minister of the state. She is also the only female to serve as the chief minister of the state.
 After securing majority in Provincial Assembly of Bagmati Province, Rajendra Prasad Pandey of the CPN (Unifed Socialist) assumed office on 27 October 2021.
 Shalikram Jamkattel assumed office on 10 January 2023.

See also 
 Chief Minister of Madhesh Province
 Chief Minister of Gandaki Province
 Chief Minister of Lumbini Province
 Chief Minister of Karnali Province
 Chief Minister of Sudurpashchim Province

References

External links 
 

Governors
 
Heads of government